Re Budge [1942] NZGazLawRp 43; [1942] NZLR 350; (1942) 44 GLR 282 is a cited case in New Zealand regarding trusts.

References

High Court of New Zealand cases
Budge
1942 in case law